Eugene Jerome Hainer (August 16, 1851 – March 17, 1929) was an American Republican Party politician.

Born in Pécs, Hungary in 1851, he immigrated to the United States with his parents settling in Columbia, Missouri, in 1854. He later moved with them in 1861 to the Hungarian settlement of New Buda, Iowa founded by George Pomutz. He spent his childhood on a farm near Garden Grove, Iowa. Was educated in Garden Grove Seminary school and then in the Iowa Agricultural College. He graduated from the law department of Simpson College in Indianola, Iowa in 1876 and was admitted to the bar in the same year.

He set up practice in Aurora, Nebraska, in 1877, becoming interested in banking and in a group of creameries in southern Nebraska. He was elected as a Republican to the Fifty-third and Fifty-fourth Congresses (March 4, 1893 – March 3, 1897). He was an unsuccessful candidate for reelection in 1896 to the Fifty-fifth Congress. He resumed practice in Aurora and moved to Lincoln, Nebraska, in 1904 while still practicing. He retired in July 1928 and moved to Omaha, Nebraska, where he resided until his death on March 17, 1929. He is buried in Wyuka Cemetery, in Lincoln, Nebraska.

References
 
 
 
 

1851 births
1929 deaths
Nebraska lawyers
Austro-Hungarian emigrants to the United States
Politicians from Columbia, Missouri
People from Aurora, Nebraska
Republican Party members of the United States House of Representatives from Nebraska
People from Pécs
19th-century American lawyers